The   South Yuba River is a left-entering tributary of the Yuba River originating in the northern Sierra Nevada at Lake Angela in Nevada County about three quarters of a mile north of Donner Pass, about three miles east of the town of Soda Springs.  After passing through Lake Van Norden with Upper Castle Creek (longer than the Lake Angela stem) entering from the right, it gathers numerous snow-fed tributaries running west through a marshy, lake-filled valley, criss-crossing Interstate 80. The river briefly enters Placer County, then flows into Lake Spaulding, then plunges westward into a steep-sided valley.  Canyon Creek enters from the right, then Poorman Creek also from the right near the town of Washington. The river continues west into the foothills, crossing under State Route 49. Its mouth is on the east shore of upper Englebright Lake, formed by a dam across the Yuba River.

The California Office of Environmental Health Hazard Assessment has issued a safe eating advisory for any fish caught in South Yuba River due to elevated levels of mercury and PCBs.

Recreation
The river begins within the Tahoe National Forest. Parks along or near the South Yuba River include:
Malakoff Diggins State Historic Park
South Yuba River State Park

Course

See also
 North Yuba River

References

External links

Y
Rivers of the Sierra Nevada (United States)
Tributaries of the Feather River
Tahoe National Forest
Rivers of Northern California
Rivers of the Sierra Nevada in California